SM Energy Company is a company engaged in hydrocarbon exploration. It is organized in Delaware and headquartered in Denver, Colorado.

The company was known as St. Mary Land & Exploration Company until 2010.

The company's assets are in the Eagle Ford Group (57% of reserves and 45% of 2021 production) and the Permian Basin (43% of reserves and 55% of 2021 production).

As of December 31, 2021, the company had  of estimated proved reserves, of which 41% was petroleum, 17% was natural gas liquids, and 42% was natural gas.

History
The company was founded in 1908 and incorporated in 1915.

In 1992, the company became a public company via an initial public offering.

In 2003, the company sold its assets in the Fort Chadbourne field for $17 million.

In 2008, the company sold assets to Abraxas Petroleum Corporation for $131.6 million.

In January 2010, the company sold assets in the Rocky Mountains for $267 million.

In May 2010, the company changed its name from St. Mary Land & Exploration Company to SM Energy.

In 2011, the company sold a partial interest in its holdings in the Eagle Ford Group to Mitsui & Co.

In 2013, the company sold its assets in the Anadarko Basin for $329 million.

In 2014, the company acquired 66,000 acres in the Bakken Formation for $330 million.

In June 2015, the company sold its assets in the Arkoma Basin of Oklahoma for $270 million.

In July 2015, the company sold its 76,300 net acres of Ark-La-Tex assets to Aethon Energy and RedBird Capital.

In August 2016, the company acquired Rock Oil Holdings LLC, which owned 24,783 net acres in Howard County, Texas, from Riverstone Holdings for $980 million.

On October 18, 2016, the company announced the purchase of assets in West Texas for $1.6 billion from an affiliate of EnCap Investments and the sale of assets in the Williston Basin for $0.8 billion to Oasis Petroleum.

In 2017, the company sold assets in the Eagle Ford Group for $800 million.

In 2018, the company sold its assets in the Williston Basin.

References

External links

American companies established in 1908
Companies based in Denver
Companies listed on the New York Stock Exchange
Energy companies established in 1908
Natural gas companies of the United States
Non-renewable resource companies established in 1908
Oil companies of the United States